The Samsung Papyrus is an e-reader that was released by Samsung in June 2009 in South Korea. It had a touchscreen display and shipped with an aluminum stylus and utility applications such as calculator, scheduler, and contacts. The device did not come with wireless capabilities so it had to be connected to a computer to transfer e-books on the device. Upon introduction, it was announced that the Papyrus would come in different colors and would be outfitted with a 512 MB internal memory. There are those who suggest that the foldable concept phone introduced by the South Korean tech company referred to a Galaxy Wing and Galaxy X would be the first in the Papyrus line.

References

Dedicated ebook devices
Samsung Electronics products